The Yung Feng class (Chinese: 永豐) are a series of coastal minehunters designed to find, identify, and destroy moored and bottom naval mines. They were built in Germany by Abeking & Rasmussen for the Republic of China Navy.

Description
The Yung Feng class can conduct both mine hunting and mine sweeping operations. They were built in Germany by Abeking & Rasmussen for the Republic of China Navy.

History
The Yung Feng-class minehunters were commissioned into service in 1991. Alternatively the Naval War College Review contends that while the vessels were delivered in 1991 they were not commissioned until 1995.

Vessels
 ROCS Yung Feng (MHC-1301)
 ROCS Yung Chia (MHC-1302)
 ROCS Yung Nien (MHC-1303)
 ROCS Yung Shun (MHC-1305)

References

Ships built in Germany
Mine warfare vessels of the Republic of China